The Westin Seattle is a twin-tower highrise hotel in Seattle, Washington.

History
On December 28, 1966, Western International Hotels and Alcoa jointly announced the development of the $18 million Washington Plaza Hotel, to be built on the site of the historic Orpheum theater. It would be the first new large-scale hotel constructed in Seattle since the adjacent Benjamin Franklin Hotel was built in 1929. Western International President Edward E. Carlson selected the local architecture firm of John Graham & Associates to design the hotel, and the local Howard S. Wright Construction Company to build it. The two firms had also designed and constructed the Space Needle six years earlier, whose construction  was first proposed by Carlson and whose restaurant was operated by Western International from 1962-1982.

The tower was topped out in January 1969 and the hotel opened on June 29, 1969. Western International Hotels operated the Washington Plaza as one property with the now-connected Benjamin Franklin Hotel. Together, the hotel complex had 715 rooms.

The aging Benjamin Franklin wing was demolished in July 1980 for construction of a second, nearly identical tower. While work on the second tower went on, the company was renamed Westin Hotels. The Washington Plaza was the first property in the chain to be renamed, becoming The Westin Hotel on September 1, 1981. That same year, Westin opened a new corporate headquarters directly across the street in the Westin Building, which shared a parking garage with the hotel. The , 47-story north tower opened in June 1982 and remains the tallest hotel in the city. The Westin Seattle is currently the flagship property of the Westin brand.

The hotel's two towers are featured on the cover art for the Modest Mouse album The Lonesome Crowded West.

References

External links

 The Westin Seattle official website

Skyscraper hotels in Seattle
Twin towers
Seattle
Denny Triangle, Seattle
Downtown Seattle
Hotel buildings completed in 1969
Hotels established in 1969